Guy–Perkins School District is a public school district based in Guy, Arkansas, United States. The school district encompasses  of land serving all or portions of the Faulkner County communities in and around Guy, Twin Groves, Greenbrier, Damascus, and Quitman.

Guy–Perkins School District employs over more than 80 faculty and staff on a full time equivalent basis to provide educational programs for students ranging from prekindergarten through twelfth grade at its consolidated facility serving its elementary and secondary schools that enroll more than 450 students. The Guy–Perkins School District is a member of the Arch Ford Education Service Cooperative.

All schools in the district are accredited by the Arkansas Department of Education.

History
Guy–Perkins School District was formed in 1930 as a result of consolidation of nine small schools in proximity of Guy - Chinquapin, Cooperage Springs, Wolf Branch, Old Texas, Hendrickson, Hicks, Rowlett, Solomon Grove and Perkins.  As a condition of consolidation, Perkins residents demanded that the grade school remain in Perkins and that the district name include Perkins, and so was created the Guy–Perkins School District.  The grade school did move to Guy in 1936 and the school district ran well without major controversy until 1948 when the state required that all schools districts must have at least 350 students in attendance, a figure that was well above the district's attendance.  Subsequently, the school district merged with several black schools, although attendance remained segregated until the 1960s.

Schools

Secondary schools
 Guy–Perkins High School: Grades 7–12

Elementary schools 
 Guy–Perkins Elementary School: Grades PK–6

References

External links 
 

1930 establishments in Arkansas
School districts established in 1930
School districts in Arkansas
Education in Faulkner County, Arkansas